Penicillium aurantiogriseum is a plant pathogen infecting asparagus and strawberry.  Chemical compounds isolated from Penicillium aurantiogriseum include anicequol and auranthine.

References

External links 
 Index Fungorum
 USDA ARS Fungal Database

Fungal strawberry diseases
Vegetable diseases
aurantiacobrunneum
Fungi described in 1901